Smith Cabin Run is a tributary of North Branch Mehoopany Creek in Sullivan County, Pennsylvania, in the United States. The stream has a high gradient and flows primarily through forested land. It has an unnamed pond at its headwaters and a  waterfall on an unnamed tributary.

Course
Smith Cabin Run begins in an unnamed pond near the road T409 in western Colley Township, close to the Colley Township/Cherry Township line. It flows northeast for a short distance and enters a valley, where it flows east for a few tenths of a mile and then east-southeast. After several tenths of a mile, the stream's valley broadens and it receives two unnamed tributaries from the wikt:right bank. It then reaches the bottom of its valley and turns northeast, reaching its confluence with North Branch Mehoopany Creek.

Hydrology
Smith Cabin Run is not designated as an impaired waterbody. In an August 2001 study, the stream was found to be dry except in a single pool.

Geography and geology

It flows in a generally easterly direction.

The watershed also includes an unnamed pond and parts of Briskey Mountain.

Watershed and biology
The stream is entirely within the United States Geological Survey quadrangle of Colley. It joins North Branch Mehoopany Creek at Colley.

The watershed of Smith Cabin Run is primarily in forested regions. A total of 69 percent of the stream's length is within  of a road and all of it is within  of one. In 2000, the population density of the watershed was 4 people per square kilometer (10 per square mile).

Wild trout naturally reproduce in the watershed of Smith Cabin Run from its headwaters downstream to its mouth. The stream is classified as a Coldwater Fishery.

History and recreation
Smith Cabin Run was entered into the Geographic Names Information System on August 2, 1979. Its identifier in the Geographic Names Information System is 1187856.

Pennsylvania Fish and Boat Commission biologists visited Smith Cabin Run in August 2001 and found that there were no fish habitats there. However, in May 2014, the Pennsylvania Fish and Boat Commission held a meeting to determine whether to add Smith Cabin Run, among other streams, to their list of wild trout streams.

A portion of Pennsylvania State Game Lands Number 66 is in the watershed of Smith Cabin Run.

See also
Barnes Brook, next tributary of North Branch Mehoopany Creek going downstream
Wolf Run (North Branch Mehoopany Creek), next tributary of North Branch Mehoopany Creek going upstream
List of rivers of Pennsylvania

References

Tributaries of North Branch Mehoopany Creek